Demis Armen Ohandjanian (born 1 May 1978 in Manchester) is an English former professional football striker of Armenian descent. He played in the English Football League for Doncaster Rovers.

Ohandjanian joined Middlewich Athletic in time for the start of the 1996–97 season. He had a brief spell with Curzon Ashton before joining Doncaster Rovers in January 1997. He made just one league appearance for Rovers, playing as a substitute in their 2–0 defeat away to Northampton Town. Released, he joined Macclesfield Town in February 1997, scoring on his club debut as Macclesfield won 2–0 away to Morecambe in the Spalding Cup. In November 1997 he scored on his debut for Winsford United.

He later joined Mossley, scoring five times in 15 games during the 1998–99 and 1999–2000 seasons.

He went on to play for Caernarfon Town, Stafford Rangers, Winsford United, Flixton, Woodley Sports and Cheadle Town before rejoining Woodley Sports. In the 2003 close season he left Woodley Sports to join Abbey Hey.

References

1976 births
Armenian footballers
Footballers from Manchester
British people of Armenian descent
Curzon Ashton F.C. players
Doncaster Rovers F.C. players
Macclesfield Town F.C. players
Mossley A.F.C. players
Caernarfon Town F.C. players
Stafford Rangers F.C. players
Winsford United F.C. players
Flixton F.C. players
Stockport Sports F.C. players
Cheadle Town F.C. players
Abbey Hey F.C. players
English Football League players
Living people
Association football forwards